The Greenwich Playhouse was an 84-seat studio theatre in the central Greenwich district of the Royal Borough of Greenwich which opened in 1990 and closed in 2012.

It was situated above and had its entrance within the St. Christopher's Inn pub, situated on the east side of the forecourt of Greenwich station.

In January 2012 the Greenwich Playhouse's closure as a producing theatre was again announced, coming into effect in April 2012.

See also
 Greenwich Theatre - a proscenium style theatre also in Greenwich.

References

External links
 Galleon Theatre Company

Theatres completed in 1990
Theatres in the Royal Borough of Greenwich
Pub theatres in London
Studio theatres in London
1990 establishments in England
2012 disestablishments in England